Cuscuta sandwichiana (Kauna'oa kahakai) is a parasitic vine and the only member of the genus Cuscuta that is endemic to the Hawaiian Islands. It parasitizes a wide variety of indigenous, endemic and introduced plants on all of the main Hawaiian islands. It grows in coastal areas with sandy soils from sea level elevation to 975 feet.  The indigenous kaunaʻoa pehu (literally "swollen kaunaʻoa") Cassytha filiformis is a similar looking species with the same parasitic nature. It is an unrelated plant in the Laurel family Lauraceae which can be distinguished by it larger, coarser yellowish-green stems.

Appearance 
Cuscuta sandwichiana is a twining vine with thin, leafless yellow to yellow-orange stems and very small yellowish flowers which grow in small clusters along the stems.

Hawaiian use 
Lei (garland): Kaunaʻoa kahakai was used for both lei o ka poʻo (head lei) and lei āʻī (neck lei)

Medicinal: Plants of both kaunaʻoa kahakai and kaunaʻoa pehu were pounded until soft, strained, and juice drunk to thin blood for women who had given birth or who had thick blood.

References

External links 
 Native Plans Hawaii: Cuscuta sandwichiana (accessed September 17, 2015)
 Plants for Hawaiian Lei (accessed September 17, 2015)
 Hawaiian Native Plant Propagation Database: Cuscuta sandwichiana (accessed September 17, 2015)

sandwichiana
Taxa named by Jacques Denys Choisy